The 12th Cruiser Squadron  also known as Cruiser Force G  was a formation of cruisers of the British Royal Navy from 1914 to 1915 and then again from 1939 to 1943.

History

First formation
The squadron was first formed 1 August 1914 and was initially assigned to the Channel Fleet as Cruiser Force G patrolling the western Channel until February 1915. The squadron was then reassigned to the Grand Fleet where it remained before being disbanded in February 1915.

Rear-Admiral Commanding
Included:

Second and Third formations
The squadron reformed in August 1939 initially part of the Northern Patrol of the Home Fleet based at Scapa Flow but was re-designated 11th Cruiser Squadron in October 1939. It re-formed as part of the Mediterranean Fleet in July 1942. It was reassigned from 29 January 1943 to 2 July 1943 when it became a component of Force H and again from 1 October 1943 to December 1943.

Rear/Vice-Admiral Commanding
Included:

References

Footnotes

Sources
 Elleman, Bruce A.; Paine, S. C. M. (2007). "9: World War One: The Blockade". Naval Blockades and Seapower: Strategies and Counter-Strategies, 1805–2005. Oxford, England: Routledge. .
 Friedman, Norman (2012). British Cruisers of the Victorian Era. Barnsley, England: Seaforth Publishing. .
 Jellicoe, Viscount (2014). The Grand Fleet (1914–1916): Its Creation, Development and Work. BoD – Books on Demand. .
 Mackie, Gordon. (2018) "Royal Navy Senior Appointments from 1865" (PDF). gulabin.com. Gordon Mackie.
 Watson, Dr Graham. (2015) "Royal Navy Organization and Ship Deployment, Inter-War Years 1914–1918: The Grand Fleet". www.naval-history.net. Gordon Smith.
 Watson, Dr Graham. (2015) "Royal Navy Organization in World War 2, 1939–1945: Overseas Commands and Fleets". www.naval-history.net. Gordon Smith.

Cruiser squadrons of the Royal Navy
Ship squadrons of the Royal Navy in World War I
Squadrons of the Royal Navy in World War II